Raphaël Voltz (born 2 March 1971) is a former French Paralympic sports shooter who has competed in international elite events. He is a four-time Paralympic medalist, a double World champion and European champion. He was paralysed from the waist down after a diving accident.

References

External links 
 
 

1971 births
Living people
Sportspeople from Strasbourg
Paralympic shooters of France
French male sport shooters
Shooters at the 2000 Summer Paralympics
Shooters at the 2008 Summer Paralympics
Shooters at the 2012 Summer Paralympics
Medalists at the 2000 Summer Paralympics
Medalists at the 2008 Summer Paralympics
Medalists at the 2012 Summer Paralympics